Elias Bernard Koopman (1860 – August 23, 1929) was a founder of the American Mutoscope and Biograph Company. He was also a founder of The Magic Introduction Company. He later headed the Runsyne Corporation, a maker of electrical signs.

Biography
He was born in 1860. In 1895 with William Kennedy Dickson and Herman Casler and Henry Marvin he founded the American Mutoscope and Biograph Company.

He committed suicide by stabbing himself in the abdomen in 1929 in the Hotel Cumberland. He was taken to the hospital while still alive, but he died a few hours later. He left a note for his brother, Harry Koopman telling him of his intentions. In the note he asked that his family not mourn for him. He also asked that his body be donated to science. He was 69 years old.

Patents
 pocket lamp

External links

References

1860 births
1929 deaths
1929 suicides
Suicides by sharp instrument in the United States
Suicides in New York City